The 226th Battalion, CEF was a unit in the Canadian Expeditionary Force during the First World War.

History 
Based in Dauphin, Manitoba, the unit began recruiting in March 1916 in the area of Dauphin and Minnedosa, Manitoba.  After sailing to England in December 1916, the battalion was absorbed into the 14th Reserve Battalion on April 7, 1917.  The 226th Battalion, CEF had one Officer Commanding: Lieut-Col. R. A. Gillespie.

Battle Honours 
In 1929, the battalion was awarded the theatre of war honour "The Great War, 1916–17".

Perpetuation 
The 226th Battalion is perpetuated by The Fort Garry Horse, the 49th Field Artillery Regiment, RCA, and The Royal Winnipeg Rifles.

References

Meek, John F. Over the Top! The Canadian Infantry in the First World War. Orangeville, Ont.: The Author, 1971.
Library and Archives Canada - Soldiers of the First World War, CEF

Battalions of the Canadian Expeditionary Force
Military units and formations of Manitoba
Dauphin, Manitoba